The 1997–98 Macedonian Football Cup was the 6th season of Macedonia's football knockout competition. FK Sileks were the defending champions, having won their second title. The 1997–98 champions were FK Vardar who won their third title.

Competition calendar

Source:

First round

|}

Sources:

Group stage

The most results are unknown.

Group 1

Group 2

Group 3
Makedonija GP and Vardar were advanced to the quarterfinal, the other teams in group were Bregalnica Delchevo and Tikvesh.

Sources:

Group 4

Quarter-finals

|}

Semi-finals

|}

Final

See also
1997–98 Macedonian First Football League
1997–98 Macedonian Second Football League

References

External links
 1997–98 Macedonian Football Cup at rsssf.org
 Official Website
 Macedonian Football

Macedonia
Cup
Macedonian Football Cup seasons